Weathering steel, often referred to by the genericised trademark COR-TEN steel and sometimes written without the hyphen as corten steel, is a group of steel alloys which were developed to eliminate the need for painting, and form a stable rust-like appearance after several years' exposure to weather.

U.S. Steel (USS) holds the registered trademark on the name COR-TEN. The name COR-TEN refers to the two distinguishing properties of this type of steel: corrosion resistance and tensile strength. Although USS sold its discrete plate business to International Steel Group (now ArcelorMittal) in 2003, it still sells COR-TEN branded material in strip-mill plate and sheet forms.

The original COR-TEN received the standard designation A242 (COR-TEN A) from the ASTM International standards group.  Newer ASTM grades are A588 (COR-TEN B) and A606 for thin sheet.  All alloys are in common production and use.

The surface oxidation of weathering steel takes six months, but surface treatments can accelerate the oxidation of weathering steel again to as little as one hour.

History
The history of weathering steels began in the US in 1910s, when steels alloyed with different amounts of copper were exposed to the elements; the research continued into the 1920s and ca. 1926 it was discovered that phosphorus content also helps with the corrosion resistance.

In 1933 the United States Steel Corporation decided to commercialize the results of their studies and patented a steel with exceptional mechanical resistance, primarily for use in railroad hopper cars, for the handling of heavy bulk loads including coal, metal ores, other mineral products and grain. The controlled corrosion for which this material is now best known was a welcome benefit discovered soon after, prompting USS to apply the trademarked name Cor-Ten. Because of its inherent toughness, this steel is still used extensively for bulk transport and storage containers.

Railroad passenger cars were also being built with Cor-Ten, albeit painted, by Pullman-Standard for the Southern Pacific from 1936, continuing through commuter coaches for the Rock Island Line in 1949.

In 1964, the Moorestown Interchange was built over New Jersey Turnpike at milepost 37.02. This overpass is believed to be the first highway structure application of weathering steel. Other states including Iowa, Ohio, and Michigan followed soon after. Those were followed by York University Footbridge in the United Kingdom in 1967. Since then, the practice of using weather steel in bridges has expanded to many countries.

Properties

Weathering refers to the chemical composition of these steels, allowing them to exhibit increased resistance to atmospheric corrosion compared to other steels.  This is because the steel forms a protective layer on its surface under the influence of the weather.

The corrosion-retarding effect of the protective layer is produced by the particular distribution and concentration of alloying elements in it. It is not yet clear how exactly the patina formation differs from usual rusting, but it's established that drying of the wetted surface is necessary and that copper is the most important alloying element.

The layer protecting the surface develops and regenerates continuously when subjected to the influence of the weather.  In other words, the steel is allowed to rust in order to form the protective coating.

The mechanical properties of weathering steels depend on which alloy and how thick the material is.

ASTM A242 

ASTM A242 is available in Type 1 and Type 2. Both have different applications based on the thickness. Type 1 is often used in housing structures, construction industry and freight cars. The Type 2 steel, which is also called Corten B, is used primarily in urban furnishing, passenger ships or cranes.

ASTM A588 

Uses

Weathering steel is popularly used in outdoor sculptures for its distressed antique appearance. One example is the large Chicago Picasso sculpture, which stands in the plaza of the Daley Center Courthouse in Chicago, which is also constructed of weathering steel. Other examples include Barnett Newman's Broken Obelisk; several of Robert Indiana's Numbers sculptures and his original Love sculpture; numerous works by Richard Serra; the Alamo sculpture in Manhattan, NY; the Barclays Center, Brooklyn, New York; the Angel of the North, Gateshead; and Broadcasting Tower at Leeds Beckett University.

It is also used in bridge and other large structural applications such as the New River Gorge Bridge, the second span of the Newburgh–Beacon Bridge (1980), and the creation of the Australian Centre for Contemporary Art (ACCA) and MONA.

It is very widely used in marine transportation, in the construction of intermodal containers as well as visible sheet piling along recently widened sections of London's M25 motorway.

The first use of weathering steel for architectural applications was the John Deere World Headquarters in Moline, Illinois. The building was designed by architect Eero Saarinen, and completed in 1964. The main buildings of Odense University, designed by Knud Holscher and Jørgen Vesterholt and built 1971–1976, are clad in weathering steel, earning them the nickname Rustenborg (Danish for "rusty fortress"). In 1977, Robert Indiana created a Hebrew version of the Love sculpture made from weathering steel using the four-letter word ahava (אהבה, "love" in Hebrew) for the Israel Museum Art Garden in Jerusalem, Israel. In Denmark, all masts for supporting the catenary on electrified railways are made of weathering steel for aesthetic reasons.

Weathering steel was used in 1971 for the Highliner  electric cars built by the St. Louis Car Company for Illinois Central Railroad. The use of weathering steel was seen as a cost-cutting move in comparison with the contemporary railcar standard of stainless steel.  A subsequent order in 1979 was built to similar specs, including weathering steel bodies, by Bombardier. The cars were painted, a standard practice for weathering steel railcars. The durability of weathering steel did not live up to expectations, with rust holes appearing in the railcars. Painting may have contributed to the problem, as painted weathering steel is no more corrosion-resistant than conventional steel, because the protective patina will not form in time to prevent corrosion over a localized area of attack such as a small paint failure. These cars have been retired by 2016.

Weathering steel was used to build the exterior of Barclays Center, made up of 12,000 pre-weathered steel panels engineered by ASI Limited & SHoP Construction. The New York Times says of the material, "While it can look suspiciously unfinished to the casual observer, it has many fans in the world of art and architecture."

Disadvantages

Using weathering steel in construction presents several challenges. Ensuring that weld-points weather at the same rate as the other materials may require special welding techniques or material. Weathering steel is not rust-proof in itself: if water is allowed to accumulate on the surface of the steel, it will experience a higher corrosion rate, so provision for drainage must be made. Weathering steel is sensitive to humid subtropical climates, and in such environments it is possible that the protective patina may not stabilize but instead continue to corrode.  For example, the former Omni Coliseum, built in 1972 in Atlanta, never stopped rusting and eventually large holes appeared in the structure. This was a major factor in the decision to demolish it just 25 years after construction.  The same thing can happen in environments laden with sea salt.  Hawaii's Aloha Stadium, built in 1975, is one example of this. Weathering steel's normal surface weathering can also lead to rust stains on nearby surfaces.

The rate at which some weathering steels form the desired patina varies strongly with the presence of atmospheric pollutants which catalyze corrosion. While the process is generally successful in large urban centers, the weathering rate is much slower in more rural environments. Uris Hall, a social sciences building on Cornell University's main campus in Ithaca, a small town in Upstate New York, did not achieve the predicted surface finish on its Bethlehem Steel Mayari-R weathering steel framing within the predicted time. Rainwater runoff from the slowly rusting steel stained the numerous large windows and increased maintenance costs. Corrosion without the formation of a protective layer apparently led to the need for emergency structural reinforcement and galvanizing in 1974, less than two years after opening.

The U.S. Steel Tower in Pittsburgh, Pennsylvania, was constructed by U.S. Steel in part to showcase COR-TEN steel. The initial weathering of the material resulted in a discoloration, known as "bleeding" or "runoff", of the surrounding city sidewalks and nearby buildings. A cleanup effort was orchestrated by the corporation once weathering was complete to clean the markings.  A few of the nearby sidewalks were left uncleaned, and remain a rust color. This problem has been reduced in newer formulations of weathering steel. Staining can be prevented if the structure can be designed so that water does not drain from the steel onto concrete where stains would be visible.

See also
 Iron (disambiguation)
 Iron pillar (disambiguation), with some characteristics similar to weathering steel 
 Steel (disambiguation)
 Weathering

References

External links 

 Report on Weathering Steel in TxDOT Bridges from the Texas Department of Transportation (4464 KB). Contains recommended details to avoid staining. Note: wrapping of piers was later found not to be cost-effective.
 A Primer on Weathering Steel from STRUCTURE magazine (2005)
 Weathering Steel from Colorado and London (2020)

 
Structural steel
Steels
Sculpture materials
U.S. Steel